is an Amor near-Earth asteroid. It was discovered on 5 December 2010 by the Catalina Sky Survey at an apparent magnitude of 19.7 using a  Schmidt–Cassegrain telescope. Three precovery images are known from 1 July 1995. With an observation arc of 16 years, the orbit is well determined with an orbital uncertainty of 0. With an absolute magnitude of 20.0, the asteroid is about 270–590 meters in diameter.

On 29 July 2014 the asteroid passed  from Mars.

References

External links 
 
 
 

Minor planet object articles (unnumbered)
20101205
Discoveries by the Catalina Sky Survey